Ian Stanley (14 November 1948 – 29 July 2018) was an Australian professional golfer.

Stanley was born in Melbourne. He started playing at the age of 14 at the old Amstel Golf Club which backed onto his parents' home in Ian Grove, Mount Waverley. In 1966, he won both the Club Championship and Junior Championship and, later in the same year, won the Victorian School Boys at Huntingdale Golf Club. As Amstel was moving to a new site in Cranbourne, Stanley was asked to join Huntingdale, where he honed his game under the watchful eye of club professional Geoff Flanagan. In 1967, he won the Victorian Junior Championship at Huntingdale and in 1969, he went on to win both the Junior and Senior Club Championships (also played at Huntingdale). He followed this up with his second Victorian Junior Championship win all in the same year.

Career
After turning professional in 1970, Ian served a three-year apprenticeship under the guidance of Geoff Flanagan. Stanley was a prolific tournament winner in Australasia from the mid-1970s through the early 1990s. He also spent seven years on the European Tour in the 1970s, where he was joint winner of the 1975 Martini International with Christy O'Connor Jnr, and finished inside the top-60 on the Order of Merit six times with a best end of season ranking of 27th in 1975.

In the early 1990s, Stanley joined Australia's first pay TV sports channel, Premier Sports, commentating on European and American tournaments. This led to the highly rated Golf Show which is still successfully running on Fox Sports today.

From 1977 to 1978, Stanley worked with David Inglis in establishing the Australian Masters and obtaining sponsorships for the first tournament in 1979. 

After the tragic accident which injured Jack Newton in July 1983, Stanley, with other businessmen, set up the Jack Newton Trust. Stanley travelled around Australia raising money through exhibitions and guest speaking engagements. This concluded with a sell-out sportsmen's night held at the Southern Cross Hotel in September 1983.

In 1983, Stanley was approached by the PGA to take Newton's position on the board where Stanley tried to establish an Accident & Sickness policy for each player; this was voted down in the 1986 PGA annual meeting.

After turning 50, Stanley joined the European Seniors Tour, and in 2001 he won the PGA Seniors Championship, then the Senior British Open on his way to topping the Order of Merit. In total, he has three wins on the European Seniors Tour.

On retiring from the Senior tour in 2004, Stanley joined golf design and architect firm Thomson Perrett, where his principal design stage was golf greens. Stanley also project managed courses in Australia and China. The main golf courses in Australia included Ballarat Golf Club, Sandhurst Golf Club, Silverwoods at Yarawonga, Mandalay Golf Club and Manly Golf Club, Sydney (greens and bunker designs).

Personal life
Stanley was a director of not-for-profit organisation Tee Up for Kids, which raises money for underprivileged children in Victoria.

Stanley married his wife, Pam, in 1971. They had three daughters. Stanley died from cancer on 29 July 2018.

Amateur wins
1966 Victorian Schoolboys' Champion
1967 Victorian Junior Champion
1969 Victorian Junior Champion

Professional wins (30)

European Tour wins (1)

PGA Tour of Australasia wins (8)

PGA Tour of Australasia playoff record (2–3)

Source:

Other Australasian wins (11)
1980 Wembley Classic, Geraldton Classic
1983 Hume Classic, Murray River Classic
1984 Murray River Classic, South Australian PGA Championship
1985 Geraldton Classic
1986 Murray River Classic
1987 South West Open
1992 Norfolk Island Classic, Victorian Open (non-tour event)

Other wins (5)
1975 New Britain Open (Papua New Guinea)
1976 South Seas Classic
1986 Fiji Open
1988 Fijian Hotel Classic
1990 Fijian Hotel Classic

Senior PGA Tour wins (1)

Senior PGA Tour playoff record (1–0)

European Senior Tour wins (3)

European Senior Tour playoff record (1–0)

Other senior wins (2)
1998 Australian PGA Seniors Championship, Ipswich Senior Classic

Results in major championships

Note: Stanley only played in The Open Championship.

CUT = missed the half-way cut (3rd round cut in 1973, 1976 and 1977 Open Championships)
"T" = tied

Senior major championships

Wins (1)

1Defeated Charles with a par at the first hole of a sudden-death playoff.

Team appearances
World Cup (representing Australia): 1974, 1975
UBS Warburg Cup (representing the Rest of the World): 2001

References

External links

Australian male golfers
PGA Tour of Australasia golfers
European Tour golfers
European Senior Tour golfers
Winners of senior major golf championships
Golfers from Melbourne
People from Mount Waverley, Victoria
Sportsmen from Victoria (Australia)
1948 births
2018 deaths